Sloane may refer to:

Names 
 Sloane (surname)
 Sloane Crosley, American writer and publicist 
 Sloane Stephens, American professional tennis player

Places 
 Sloane, New South Wales
 Sloane Square, a location in London, named after Hans Sloane:
 Sloane Street, which terminates at Sloane Square
 Sloane Square tube station, a London Underground station near Sloane Square

Popular culture 
 Sloane Ranger, shortened to Sloane, is a slang term for young, upper-middle-class West Londoners
 Entertaining Mr Sloane, a 1964 play by Joe Orton
Entertaining Mr Sloane, the 1970 film version of the play by Joe Orton
 Sloane (film), a 1984 action movie starring Robert Resnik
 Mr. Sloane, a 2014 British television series
 Miss Sloane, a 2016 American political thriller starring Jessica Chastain
 Arvin Sloane, a character in the American TV series Alias
 Lily Sloane, a character in Star Trek
 Lone Sloane, a character in the sci-fi comics of Druillet
 Sloane Peterson, Ferris Bueller's girlfriend in the movie Ferris Bueller's Day Off

See also 
 Sloan (disambiguation) 
 Slone (disambiguation)